The Grantham River is a river in the Canterbury region of New Zealand. It arises in the Hanmer Range near Mount Miromiro, in the Hanmer Forest Park, and flows south-east into the Waiau Uwha River, which has its mouth on the Pacific Ocean.

A thermal spring on the river is undeveloped.

See also
List of rivers of New Zealand

References

Land Information New Zealand - Search for Place Names

Hurunui District
Rivers of Canterbury, New Zealand
Rivers of New Zealand